The European Fashion Council is a non-governmental organization authorized to represent the European Union in fashion and fashion design worldwide. It is a union of 20 countries that are primarily located in Europe.

History 

The organization was founded on May 19, 2007 in House-Museum "Hindliyan", Old Town of Plovdiv, Bulgaria by the following 11 European countries:

 

EFC was officially registered on 6 August 2007 in the District Court of Plovdiv, Bulgaria, which was the very first step towards the conjunction of the different national fashion industries in Europe. Its first significant recognition was in January, 2010, when the organization was officially registered in the Transparency Register of the European Union by the European Commission as an NGO/think-thank for fashion. It was the following year, 2011, when the European Fashion Council officially became an institutionalized organization of the EU for the adoption of its official logo depicting three circular constellations of yellow stars on a blue background. In the month of May, 2012, the European Fashion Council officially became one of the 16 eligible organizations with an approved status to implement the UNESCO Convention on the Protection and Promotion of the Diversity of Cultural Expressions.
As of March, 2014, the European Fashion Council has 20 member states, represented by national Non-Governmental Organizations of the fashion industries in Europe, as well as 14,100 members that are companies, organizations and people - fashion designers, photographers, stylists, makeup artists, fashion design teachers and others related to the fashion industry of Europe.

Mission 

The European Fashion Council strives for: 
 Integration, tolerance and cooperation between the different European fashion industries; 
 Popularization, support and establishment of the fashion art on a pan-European level;
 Support of the development of the fashion design in Europe; 
 Development of the cooperation between the business circles of the represented member states;
 Exchange and realization of ideas, events, initiatives and concepts by the member states.
To achieve its goals, the EFC:
 Examines its legal acts and the current economic situation of the fashion industries in Europe and their trends;
 Helps for the establishment of a climate, appropriate for cooperation between the companies and organizations in the represented countries;
 Assists in the lobbying of the members before their official institutions for the stimulation of the fashion design and the activities related to it - production, commerce, services and finances;
 Helps in facilitating the business visits of designers, models, photographers and all other persons taking part in the fashion events, to any European country, as well as between the represented countries, for the purposes of the development of the European economic cooperation;
 Presents concepts for structural changes in the economic fields of its member states in accordance with the criteria and the standards of the European Union;
 Assists the member states in solving their possible arguments and issues by means of negotiations;
 Exchanges experience in the field of intellectual property rights with other European organizations and offers protection on the copyright of the designers and fashion houses who work in Europe;
 Supports the education in the various areas of the European fashion industry through the establishment of schools and academies.
 Represents new fashion labels, products and services;
 Works for the establishment of the fashion design as a cultural factor;
 Builds up a network of complex designers centers in each member state.

Structure

Organisational structure 

The EFC's legislative structure has an hierarchical form. Currently the president of the organization is the National Fashion Chamber of Republic of Bulgaria whose chairperson is Ms. Nadya Valeva - founder of both the European Fashion Council and the National Fashion Chamber of Bulgaria.
The European Fashion Council also has three vice presidents:
 Mrs. Sonja Noel - Modo Bruxellae, Belgium;
 Mrs. Anne Marie Mondrup - President of Fashion Tomorrow Management, Denmark;
 Mrs. Gabriella Walek - President of the National Fashion League Hungary, Hungary.

In 2010, the European Fashion Council established an ethical commission, whose main duty is to be a mediator between members and institutions, authors and consumers of fashion and fashion design in Europe as well as the body, that is deputed to resolve conflicts and to determine whether to impose sanctions on the basis of the Regulations of the European ethical fashion code. The president of this official authority of the EFC is the National Research-Development Institute for Textile and Leather, Romania.

Membership 

As of March, 2014, the European Fashion Council comprises 20 member states. The persons who are engaged in the activities of the European Fashion Council and fall under the scope of transparency, are active on a voluntary basis.

See also 

 European Union
 European Commission

References

External links 
 
 

Pan-European trade and professional organizations
European culture
Organizations established in 2007
Fashion organizations